The Marion Park Pavilion is a multi-use dance hall and Pavilion in Glidden, Wisconsin, United States. It was added to the National Register of Historic Places in 1981.

The pavilion is located in Marion Park, and was built in 1938. It designed to provide unobstructed space for dancing. The building is now used a community gathering place, such as during the local Glidden Community Fair. The building has an unusual octagonal shape, with a domed roof. The building is considered seasonal, and therefore has no heating system, for winter use. However, the building does have electricity.

See also
National Register of Historic Places listings in Ashland County, Wisconsin

References

Buildings and structures in Ashland County, Wisconsin
Buildings and structures completed in 1938
National Register of Historic Places in Ashland County, Wisconsin
Park buildings and structures on the National Register of Historic Places in Wisconsin
Pavilions in the United States